Jason Winer (born December 7, 1972) is an American director, producer, writer, actor, and comedian. He is best known for directing the pilot and 22 additional episodes of the American sitcom Modern Family.

Early life
Winer was born and raised in Baltimore, Maryland. He is Jewish.  He attended the Friends School of Baltimore and Northwestern University and is an alumnus of the Improv Olympic Theatre.

Career
After college, Winer acted in television commercials for companies such as Budweiser, Nike and Dr Pepper. He also did stand-up comedy on channels such as HBO and was one of the stars on the TV game show The Blame Game on MTV. He eventually moved into work behind the camera, directing The Adventures of Big Handsome Guy and His Little Friend in 2005.

Since then, Winer has directed episodes of TV shows such as Kath & Kim, Samantha Who?, Carpoolers, New Girl and Don't Trust the B---- in Apartment 23. He is a co-executive producer of Modern Family as well as a director. In 2010, Winer won the Directors Guild of America Award for Outstanding Achievement in Directing Comedy Series for Modern Family.

He was nominated for Emmy Awards for directing the Modern Family episodes "Pilot" and "Virgin Territory".

Winer directed the 2011 remake of Arthur, his first job as a motion picture director.

He also co-created the sitcom 1600 Penn with Josh Gad and Jon Lovett.

Personal life
In 2012, he married Jackie Seiden in Palm Springs, California led by actor Adam Shapiro.

References

External links
 

1972 births
People from Baltimore
Living people
American male comedians
21st-century American comedians
American male film actors
American film producers
Jewish American screenwriters
American male screenwriters
American male television actors
American television directors
American television producers
American television writers
Northwestern University alumni
Writers from Baltimore
Film directors from Maryland
Directors Guild of America Award winners
Male actors from Baltimore
American male television writers
Screenwriters from Maryland
21st-century American screenwriters
21st-century American male writers
21st-century American Jews